Pyramid Atlantic Art Center (PAAC) is a 501(c)(3) non-profit contemporary arts center specializing in papermaking, printmaking, and book arts. They are currently located at 4318 Gallatin Street in Hyattsville, Maryland.

History 
The PAAC was founded in 1981 by artist Helen C. Frederick, and is located in Hyattsville, Maryland. It had previously been located in Baltimore in the 1980s and later Silver Spring from 2003 until 2017.  

The center has an art gallery space; offers various artist opportunities and residencies; has multiple art studios including a printshop, papermaking studio, and bindery; and offers educational classes. Notable artists connected to PAAC include Renee Stout, Tanja Softic, Joyce Scott, William Christenberry, Hung Liu, Yuriko Yamaguchi, among others.  

In 2018, the IFPDA Foundation gave a grant to PAAC for archiving and digitizing their print collection.

See also 

 Artist's book

References

External links 

 

Visual arts education
Publishing companies of the United States
Book publishing companies based in Maryland
Artists' books
1981 establishments in Maryland
501(c)(3) organizations
Non-profit organizations based in Maryland
Arts organizations based in Maryland
Art museums and galleries in Maryland